Cold junction may refer to:

Cold junction (thermocouple), a contact of a thermocouple
Cold junction (soldering), a cold soldering joint in soldering

See also
Cold fusion (disambiguation)
Cold contact (disambiguation)
Cold joint